Bissetia subfumalis is a moth in the family Crambidae. It was described by George Hampson in 1896. It is found in Australia, where it has been recorded from the Northern Territory.

References

Haimbachiini
Moths described in 1896